Júnior Enrique Díaz Campbell (born 12 September 1983) was a Costa Rican professional footballer who last played as a left-back for LD Alajuelense. He played for the Costa Rica national team. At a top speed of 33.8 km/h, he was deemed by FIFA as the fastest player of the 2014 FIFA World Cup.

Club career
Born in Heredia, Costa Rica, Díaz started his career at local side Herediano before moving abroad to join Polish side Wisła Kraków in January 2008. He moved on to Belgian club Club Brugge in September 2010 and was snapped up by German Bundesliga outfit FSV Mainz in summer 2012.

In 2015, after three years in Mainz, Díaz joined Darmstadt 98, a newly promoted team for the 2015–16 season.

International career
Júnior Díaz made his Costa Rica national team debut in a friendly against China on 7 September 2003.  Díaz made one appearance at Copa América 2004, entering as a second-half substitute against Chile. He appeared in all four matches as Costa Rica won the UNCAF Nations Cup 2005 tournament. Díaz also appeared in one match at the 2005 CONCACAF Gold Cup finals.

Díaz was a member of the Costa Rica national team at the 2004 Olympics in Athens. Ten years later, he became a member of the squad that reached the quarterfinals at the 2014 FIFA World Cup. He was crucial in the victory against Italy, as he served a cross to assist Bryan Ruiz's header for the lone goal of the match. In a note for La Nación, Díaz reflected on the assist, stating that "I am sure that, once I retire, many will summarize my career in one single cross."

Personal life
He is a son of former Costa Rica national team footballer Enrique Díaz and Yamileth Campbell, who divorced when he was 12. He has two brothers, Jefferson and Reydel.

Career statistics

Club

International
Scores and results list Costa Rica's goal tally first, score column indicates score after each Díaz goal.

Honours

Wisła Kraków
 Ekstraklasa: 2007–08, 2008–09, 2010–11

Alajuelense
 Liga FPD: Apertura 2020
 CONCACAF League: 2018, 2020

International
 UNCAF Nations Cup: 2005

References

External links

 
 
 

1983 births
Living people
People from Heredia Province
Association football defenders
Costa Rican men's footballers
Costa Rica international footballers
Footballers at the 2004 Summer Olympics
Olympic footballers of Costa Rica
Costa Rica under-20 international footballers
2004 Copa América players
2005 UNCAF Nations Cup players
2005 CONCACAF Gold Cup players
2011 CONCACAF Gold Cup players
2013 CONCACAF Gold Cup players
2014 FIFA World Cup players
2015 CONCACAF Gold Cup players
C.S. Herediano footballers
Wisła Kraków players
Club Brugge KV players
1. FSV Mainz 05 players
SV Darmstadt 98 players
Würzburger Kickers players
L.D. Alajuelense footballers
Ekstraklasa players
Belgian Pro League players
Bundesliga players
2. Bundesliga players
Costa Rican expatriate footballers
Expatriate footballers in Poland
Costa Rican expatriate sportspeople in Poland
Expatriate footballers in Belgium
Expatriate footballers in Germany
Copa Centroamericana-winning players